Rowan & Martin's Laugh-In (often simply referred to as Laugh-In) is an American sketch comedy television program that ran for 140 episodes from January 22, 1968, to March 12, 1973, on the NBC television network, hosted by comedians Dan Rowan and Dick Martin. It originally aired as a one-time special on September 9, 1967, and was such a success that it was brought back as a series, replacing The Man from U.N.C.L.E. on Mondays at 8 pm (ET). It quickly became the most popular television show in the United States.

The title of the show was a play on the 1960s hippie culture "love-ins" or the counterculture "be-ins", terms derived from the "sit-ins" common in protests associated with civil rights and antiwar demonstrations of the time. In 2002, Rowan & Martin's Laugh-In was ranked number 42 on TV Guide's 50 Greatest TV Shows of All Time.  In the pilot episode Dan Rowan explained the show's approach: "Good evening ladies and gentlemen and welcome to television's first Laugh-In.  Now for the past few years we have all been hearing an awful lot about the various 'ins'.  There have been be-ins, love-ins, and sleep-ins.  This is a laugh-in and a laugh-in is a frame of mind.  For the next hour we would just like you to sit back and laugh and forget about the other ins."  The good-natured, lighthearted though informal disposition of the show was therefore established.

Laugh-In had its roots in the humor of vaudeville and burlesque, but its most direct influences were Olsen and Johnson's comedies (such as the free-form Broadway revue Hellzapoppin'), the innovative television works of Ernie Kovacs, and the topical satire of That Was The Week That Was. The show was characterized by a rapid-fire series of gags and sketches, many of which were politically charged or contained sexual innuendo. The co-hosts continued the exasperated straight man (Rowan) and "dumb guy" (Martin) act which they had established as nightclub comics. The show featured Gary Owens as the on-screen announcer, and an ensemble cast; Ruth Buzzi was part of the ensemble throughout the show's six year run, while others who appeared in at least three seasons included Judy Carne, Henry Gibson, Goldie Hawn, Arte Johnson, Jo Anne Worley, Alan Sues, Lily Tomlin,  Dennis Allen and Richard Dawson.

Episodes

Laugh-In was designed to be very lightly structured and consisted mainly of short comedic sketches. Some of these would reappear multiple times throughout an episode with variations on a theme, while others involved reoccurring characters created by the cast. In others, castmembers and guest stars would simply appear as themselves, delivering jokes or reacting to a previous sketch. In addition to the announced guest star or stars of the evening, some recurring guest stars would appear unannounced multiple times through a season (which was easy to accomplish given the show's non-linear taping sessions). A trademark of the series was its (even shorter) blackout sketches, often involving rapid-fire cuts between two or more scenes or camera angles, set to a six-note musical sting (or at times, an elongated 16-note version). These were used as transitions into and out of commercials, among other places.

The show started with a batch of sketches leading into Gary Owens' introduction segment, in which the cast and announced guest star(s) would appear behind open doors of the show's iconic, psychedelically painted "Joke Wall". Owens would also insert offbeat lines in his monotone, deadpan style, in the introductions and occasionally throughout the episode, generally facing a microphone to his side with one hand cupped to his ear (Owens's character loosened up and became "hipper" in later seasons).

After more short sketches leading into and out of the first commercial break, Rowan and Martin would walk in front of the show's homebase set to introduce the show and have a dialogue, generally consisting of Martin frustrating Rowan by derailing his attempt to do a proper introduction via misunderstandings or digressions.

Eventually, Rowan would end the introduction and invite the audience to the "Cocktail Party". This live to tape segment comprised all cast members and occasional surprise celebrities dancing before a 1960s "mod" party backdrop, delivering one- and two-line jokes interspersed with a few bars of dance music. (This was similar in format to the "Word Dance" segments of A Thurber Carnival, and would later be imitated on The Muppet Show.)

Another weekly segment was "Laugh-In Looks At The News", which began with the female castmembers singing the segment's opening theme in a different costumed set piece each week, often with the help of the guest star. The news varied in presentation over the years, but in the earlier seasons started with Martin reading the "News of the Present", with Rowan providing "News of the Future" and sketches depicting the "News of the Past". Alan Sues, as his "Big Al" character, would provide a typically clueless sports report.

"Mod, Mod World" was a group of sketches introduced by Rowan and Martin that fit into an announced theme. This segment is notable for being interspersed with film clips of some of the female castmembers (most frequently Carne and Hawn) performing go-go dancing in bikinis to the segment's burlesque-inspired theme, with the camera periodically zooming into jokes or images that had been drawn onto their bodies. The segment also usually included an additional musical number based on the topic, performed by castmembers at the beginning and end of the segment, as well as in short bridges between sketches.

At the end of every show, after a final dialogue, Rowan turned to his co-host and said, "Say good night, Dick", to which Martin replied, "Good night, Dick!", leading into the final Joke Wall segment, in which the cast popped out of their doors and told jokes to the camera, each other, or Rowan and Martin, who stood in front. This would lead into and continue under the closing credits. One final batch of skits, including a closing appearance from Owens, and often an appearance from Arte Johnson's character, German soldier Wolfgang ("veeeeery eeenteresting!"), brought the episode to a conclusion.

Other segments and recurring characters, listed below, would come and go throughout the years.

Cast

Pilot and season 1
The pilot featured Ruth Buzzi, Judy Carne, Henry Gibson, Larry Hovis, Arte Johnson, and Jo Anne Worley, all of whom continued as season one regulars (and, except for Hovis, several seasons thereafter), along with future guest stars Ken Berry, Pamela Austin, and Barbara Feldon.

Gary Owens joined the cast in the proper first episode, as did Goldie Hawn, who was under contract to Good Morning World at the time of the pilot.

Seasons 2 and 3
The second season had a handful of new people, including Alan Sues, Dave Madden, and Chelsea Brown. All of the new cast members from season two left at the end of that season except Sues, who stayed on until 1972. At the end of the 1968–69 season, Carne chose not to renew her contract, although she did make appearances during 1969–1970.

Arte Johnson insisted on star billing, apart from the rest of the cast. The producer mollified him by having announcer Gary Owens read Johnson's credit as a separate sentence: "Starring Dan Rowan and Dick Martin! And Arte Johnson! With Ruth Buzzi ..." This maneuver gave Johnson star billing, but made it sound as though he was still part of the ensemble cast.

The third season had several new people who only stayed on for that season, including Teresa Graves and Jeremy Lloyd. Lily Tomlin joined in the middle of the season and remained until the series ended. Johnny Brown made two appearances late, and stayed through seasons 4 and 5.

Jo Anne Worley, Goldie Hawn, and Judy Carne left after the third season.

Seasons 4 and 5
The 1970–71 season brought new additions to the cast, including tall, lanky, sad-eyed Dennis Allen, who stayed until the end; writer-actress Ann Elder; and tap dancer Barbara Sharma.

Arte Johnson and Henry Gibson left the show after/during the fourth season, with former third season regular Teresa Graves making two consecutive appearances towards the end.

The fifth season saw the return of former Hogan's Heroes stars Richard Dawson and Larry Hovis, both of whom had appeared in the first season; Dawson would remain until the series ended.

The Joke Wall was briefly retired to start the season, with introductions moving to the Cocktail Party set, and the cast telling their show-closing jokes surrounded by celebrity and historical figure cutouts; after only a few episodes, the Joke Wall returned for the closing jokes.

The show celebrated its 100th episode in its fifth season, with former regulars Carne, Worley, Johnson, Gibson, Graves, and frequent guest star Tiny Tim returning for the festivities; John Wayne was also on hand for his first cameo appearance since 1968.

Season 6
For the show's final season (1972–73), Rowan and Martin assumed the executive producer roles from George Schlatter and Ed Friendly. Along with returnees Dawson, Owens, Buzzi, Allen, and occasional appearances from Tomlin, a new cast was brought in. This final season featured comedian Patti Deutsch, folksy singer-comedian Jud Strunk, ventriloquist act Willie Tyler and Lester, and giddy Goldie Hawn lookalike Sarah Kennedy, among others. Voice artist Frank Welker also made numerous appearances. Former regular Jo Anne Worley returned for two guest appearances, including the final episode.

This last season was not included in the edited half-hour rerun package that was syndicated (through Lorimar Productions) to local stations in 1983 and later on Nick at Nite in 1987, ultimately appearing for the first time since its original run when the series began airing on Decades in 2017.

Of the more than three dozen entertainers to join the cast, only Rowan, Martin, Owens, and Buzzi were there from beginning to end. However, Owens was not in the 1967 pilot and Buzzi was not present in two first-season episodes.

Cast tenures
All seasons: Dan Rowan, Dick Martin, Gary Owens, and Ruth Buzzi
Season 1 (1968): Judy Carne, Arte Johnson, Pamela Austin, Eileen Brennan, Henry Gibson, Flip Wilson, Goldie Hawn, Larry Hovis, Roddy Maude-Roxby, Jo Anne Worley, Inga Neilsen, Paul Winchell, Tiny Tim
Season 2 (1968–69): Judy Carne, Arte Johnson, Henry Gibson, Goldie Hawn, Jo Anne Worley,  Dave Madden, Alan Sues, Chelsea Brown, "Sweet Brother" Dick Whittington (through episode 14), Charlie Brill and Mitzi McCall ("the Fun Couple"; through episode 11), Pigmeat Markham (through episode 14), Jack Riley (episodes 4, 7, 12, 13, 16), Muriel Landers (episodes 11 and 20), J.J. Barry (episodes 15–19), Byron Gilliam (dancer only), Barbi Benton (dancer only)
Season 3 (1969–70): Judy Carne (through episode 11), Arte Johnson, Henry Gibson, Goldie Hawn, Alan Sues, Jo Anne Worley, Teresa Graves, Jeremy Lloyd, Pamela Rodgers, Byron Gilliam (through episode 11, but continued as a dancer & in occasional cameos), Lily Tomlin (from episode 15), Stu Gilliam (episodes 14, 16, 19, 20, 26), Johnny Brown (episodes 22 and 24)
Season 4 (1970–71): Arte Johnson, Henry Gibson (through episode 10), Alan Sues, Lily Tomlin, Dennis Allen, Johnny Brown, Nancie Phillips (through episode 17), Barbara Sharma, Ann Elder, Harvey Jason (episodes 2 and 4), Glen Ash (episodes 10 and 11), Byron Gilliam (dancer only)
Season 5 (1971–72): Alan Sues, Lily Tomlin, Dennis Allen, Johnny Brown, Ann Elder, Barbara Sharma, Larry Hovis, Richard Dawson, Moosie Drier, Byron Gilliam (dancer only), Barbi Benton (dancer only)
Season 6 (1972–73): Lily Tomlin, Dennis Allen, Richard Dawson, Moosie Drier, Tod Bass, Patti Deutsch, Sarah Kennedy, Jud Strunk, Willie Tyler, Donna Jean Young, Frank Welker, Brian Bressler (through episode 10), Kathy Speirs (episodes 11 and 12), Lisa Farringer (from episode 13). Note: not all cast members appear in all episodes this season, and rotate with some frequency (for instance, Donna Jean Young appears in about half of the season's 24 episodes).

Regular guest performers

Jack Benny (seasons 2–4, 6)
Johnny Carson (seasons 1–6)
Carol Channing (seasons 3–5)
Tony Curtis (seasons 2–3, 5)
Sammy Davis, Jr. (seasons 1–4, 6)
Phyllis Diller (seasons 2–4, 6)
Barbara Feldon (seasons 1–2)
Zsa Zsa Gabor (seasons 2–3)
Peter Lawford (seasons 1–4; Lawford became Dan Rowan's son-in-law in 1971)
Rich Little (seasons 2, 4, 6)
Jill St. John (seasons 1, 3, 5–6)
Tiny Tim (seasons 1–3, 5)
John Wayne (seasons 1–2, 5–6)
Flip Wilson (seasons 1–4)
Henny Youngman (seasons 2, 5–6)

Series writers
The writers for Laugh-In were: George Schlatter, Larry Hovis (pilot only), Digby Wolfe, Paul W. Keyes, Hugh Wedlock, Jr. and Allan Manings, Chris Bearde (credited as Chris Beard), Phil Hahn and Jack Hanrahan, Coslough Johnson (Arte Johnson's twin brother), Marc London and David Panich, Dave Cox, Jim Carlson, Jack Mendelsohn and Jim Mulligan, Lorne Michaels and Hart Pomerantz, Jack Douglas, Jeremy Lloyd, John Carsey, Dennis Gren, Gene Farmer, John Rappaport and Stephen Spears, Jim Abell and Chet Dowling, Barry Took, E. Jack Kaplan, Larry Siegel, Jack S. Margolis, Don Reo and Allan Katz, Richard Goren (also credited as Rowby Greeber and Rowby Goren), Winston Moss, Gene Perret and Bill Richmond, Jack Wohl, Bob Howard and Bob DeVinney. Script supervisors for Laugh-In included Digby Wolfe (comedy consultant, season 1), Phil Hahn and Jack Hanrahan (season 2), Allan Manings (season 3), Marc London and David Panich (seasons 3–6), and Jim Mulligan (season 6).

Musical direction and production numbers
The musical director for Laugh-In was Ian Bernard. He wrote the opening theme music, "Inquisitive Tango" (used in Season 1 and again permanently from season 4), plus the infamous "What's the news across the nation" number. He wrote all the musical "play-ons" that introduced comedy sketches like Lily Tomlin's character, Edith Ann, the little girl who sat in a giant rocking chair, and Arte Johnson's old man character, Tyrone, who always got hit with a purse. He also appeared in many of the cocktail scenes where he directed the band as they stopped and started between jokes. Composer-lyricist Billy Barnes wrote all of the original musical production numbers in the show, and often appeared on-camera, accompanying Johnson, Buzzi, Worley, or Sues, on a golden grand piano. Barnes was the creator of the famous Billy Barnes Revues of the 1950s and 1960s, and composed such popular hits as "I Stayed Too Long at the Fair", recorded by Barbra Streisand and the jazz standard "Something Cool" recorded by June Christy. For the entire 141-episode series of Laugh-In, including the pilot, the show's musical coordinator was West Coast bebop jazz pianist and composer Russ Freeman.

Post-production
The show was recorded at NBC's Burbank facility using two-inch quadruplex videotape. As computer-controlled online editing had not been invented at the time, post-production video editing of the montage was achieved by the error-prone method of visualizing the recorded track with ferrofluid and cutting it with a razor blade or guillotine cutter and splicing with adhesive tape, in a manner similar to film editing. This had the incidental benefit of ensuring the preservation of the master tape, as a spliced tape could not be recycled for further use. Laugh-In editor Arthur Schneider won an Emmy Award in 1968 for his pioneering use of the "jump cut" – the unique editing style in which a sudden cut from one shot to another was made without a fade-out.

When the series was restored for airing by the Trio Cable Network in 1996, the aforementioned edits became problematic for the editors, as the adhesive used on the source tape had deteriorated during 20+ years of storage, making many of the visual elements at the edit points unusable. This was corrected in digital re-editing by removing the problematic video at the edit point and then slowing down the video image just before the edit point; time-expanding the slowed-down section long enough to allot enough time to seamlessly reinsert the audio portion from the removed portion of video.

Recurring sketches and characters

Sketches
Frequently recurring Laugh-In sketches included:
"Sock it to me"; Judy Carne was often tricked into saying the phrase ("It may be rice wine to you, but it's sake to me!"), which invariably results in her (or other cast members) falling through a trap door, being doused with water, or playfully assaulted in various other manners.  The phrase was also uttered by many of the cameo guest stars, most notably Richard Nixon, though they were almost never subjected to the same treatment as Carne.
"The Farkel Family", a couple with numerous children, all of whom had bright red hair and large freckles similar to their "good friend and trusty neighbor" Ferd Berfel (Dick Martin). The sketch employed diversion humor, the writing paying more attention to the lines said by each player, using alliterative tongue-twisters ("That's a fine-looking Farkel flinger you found there, Frank"). Dan Rowan played father Frank Farkel the Third, Jo Anne Worley, Barbara Sharma and Patti Deutsch played his wife Fanny Farkel, Goldie Hawn played Sparkle Farkel, Arte Johnson played Frank Farkel the Fourth, and Ruth Buzzi played Flicker Farkel, who would only say "HIIIIII!" in a very high-pitched voice. Two of the children were twins named Simon and Gar Farkel, played by cast members of different races (Teresa Graves and Pamela Rodgers in the third season, Johnny Brown and Dennis Allen in the fourth season). All of the Farkel skits were written or co-written by David Panich.
"Here Comes the Judge", originally portrayed by British comic Roddy Maude-Roxby, was a stuffy magistrate with a black robe and oversized judge's wig. Each sketch featured the judge trading barbs with a defendant brought him; on delivery of the punch line, he would strike the defendant with an inflated bladder balloon tied to the sleeve of his robe. For a time guest star Flip Wilson or Sammy Davis Jr. would introduce the sketch saying "Here come da judge!", which was a venerable catchphrase by nightclub comedian Pigmeat Markham. Surprised that his trademark had been appropriated, Markham asked producer George Schlatter to let him play the Judge himself; Schlatter agreed and Markham presided for one season. After Markham left, the sketch was briefly retired until Sammy Davis Jr. donned the judicial robe and wig during his guest appearances, introducing each sketch with a rap that always finished with "Here come da judge, here come da judge...".
"Laugh-In Looks at the News", a parody of network newscasts, introduced by the female cast members in a highly un-journalistic production number. The sketch was originally called the Rowan and Martin Report (a take-off on the Huntley-Brinkley Report). The sketch itself featured Dick humorously reporting on current events, which then segued into Dan reporting on "News of the Past" and "News of the Future". The latter of these segments, on at least two occasions, correctly predicted future events, one being that Ronald Reagan would be president, and another that the Berlin Wall would finally come down in 1989. This segment was influenced by the BBC's That Was the Week That Was, and in turn inspired Saturday Night Live's "Weekend Update" segments (SNL creator Lorne Michaels was a Laugh-In writer early in his career).  The News segments were followed by "Big Al" (Alan Sues) and his sports report in seasons 2–5.  After Sues left the show, Jud Strunk took over the sports segment ("reporting from the sports capital of Farmington, Maine") by featuring films of oddly-named events which were actual sports films played backwards.  An example is the "Cannonball Catch", featuring a backwards film of a bowling tournament where the "cannonballs" (bowling balls) are caught one-handed by the catcher (the bowler) after rolling up the alley.   
"New Talent Time" also called "Discovery of the Week" in later seasons. Introduced oddball variety acts (sometimes characters played by regular cast members)
Tin Pan Alley musician Tiny Tim – The most notable of these acts, was introduced in episode 1 and shot to fame. Returned in the Season 1 finale & made several guest appearances after.
Actor Paul Gilbert (actor) (adoptive father of actress Melissa Gilbert) appeared in three episodes as an inept French juggler, introduced as "Paul Jill-bare".
6'2" actress Inga Neilsen made appearances as a bugle/kazoo player who could only play one note of "Tiger Rag" & had to deal with Martin's advances. Martin, who hated all of the other New Talent acts would enthusiastically cheer her on despite the obvious lack of talent.
Ventriloquist Paul Winchell appeared three times as "Lucky Pierre", whose puppets would fall apart or die on him.
Arte Johnson would appear as his Pyotr Rosmenko character looking for big American break, singing gibberish in a Russian accent
Murray Langston, who later achieved fame as the Gong Show's "Unknown Comic"
Laugh-In writer Chris Bearde took the "New Talent" concept and later developed it into The Gong Show.
"The Flying Fickle Finger of Fate Award" sardonically recognized actual dubious achievements by public individuals or institutions, the most frequent recipients being members or branches of the government. The trophy was a gilded left hand mounted on a trophy base with its extended index finger adorned with two small wings.
"The Wonderful World of Whoopee Award" was a counterpart to the "Flying Fickle Finger of Fate Award", described by Rowan as a citation "for the little man who manages to outfight or outfox the bureaucracy"; the statue was similar to the Finger of Fate, only it was a right hand (without wings on the index finger) pointing straight up, and with a hidden mechanism that when activated caused the finger to wave in a circular motion.
"The C.F.G. Automat"; a vending machine whose title was an inside joke for cast members who referred to producer Schlatter as "Crazy (bleeping) George". The vending machine would distribute oddball items that were a play on the name. Examples: The 'pot pie' produced a cloud of smoke when the door was opened, then the pie floated away. The 'ladyfingers' was a woman's hand reaching out & tickling Arte's face while another 'ladyfingers' door opened & picked his pocket.
Many episodes were interspersed with a recurring, short wordless gag in which an actor repeatedly tried to accomplish some simple task like entering an elevator, opening a window or door, watering a plant, etc., which would fail each time in a different, surprising way (the object would move unexpectedly, another part of the wall or room would move, water would squirt the actor in the face from the object, etc.)
Another recurring wordless gag involved one or more actors walking around the street in a jerky fashion (using stop-motion or low shutter speed filming) holding and turning a bare steering wheel, as if they were driving a car or actually were a car, with various sound effects to simulate honking, back-ups, collisions with each other, etc.
From season four on, a variety of sketches or jokes used the word "Foon", usually as part of the name of imaginary products or persons (e.g., Foon detergent, Mr. Foonman). (They did this with "Nern" in earlier seasons.)
"Questions From The Audience / Dick's Costumes"; In the sixth season, Dan Rowan would ask the audience if anybody had any questions about the show or otherwise.  As he was doing so (in which nobody in the audience ever spoke up), Dick Martin would come out wearing some kind of costume which Rowan would ask about, leading to a humorous exchange on the costume's subject matter.

Characters

Dan Rowan, in addition to hosting, provided the "News Of The Future" and also appears as General Bull Right, a far-right-wing representative of the military establishment and outlet for political humor.
Dick Martin, in addition to hosting would also play a drunk Leonard Swizzle, husband of an equally drunk Doris Swizzle (Ruth Buzzi) & a character always buzzing for an elevator on which the doors never closed in a normal way
Announcer Gary Owens regularly stands in an old-time radio studio with his hand cupped over his ear, making announcements, often with little relation to the rest of the show, such as (in an overly-dramatic voice), "Earlier that evening ..."
Arte Johnson:
Wolfgang the German soldier – Wolfgang would often peer out from behind a potted palm and comment on the previous gag saying "Verrry in-te-res-ting", sometimes with comments such as "... but shtupid!" He eventually closed each show by talking to Lucille Ball and her husband Gary Morton, as well as the cast of Gunsmoke — both airing opposite Laugh-In on CBS; as well as whatever was on ABC. Johnson later repeated the line while playing Nazi-themed supervillain Virman Vundabar on an episode of Justice League Unlimited. Johnson also reprised his Wolfgang character in a series of skits for the second season of Sesame Street (1970–1971), and in 1980 for a series of small introductory skits with a plant on 3-2-1 Contact, during the "Growth/Decay" week.
Tyrone F. Horneigh (pronounced "hor-NIGH", presumably to satisfy the censors) was a dirty old man coming on to Gladys Ormphby (Ruth Buzzi) seated on a park bench, who almost invariably clobbers him with her purse. Both Tyrone and Gladys later became animated characters (voiced by Johnson and Buzzi) in "The Nitwits" segments of the 1977 Saturday morning animated television show, Baggy Pants and the Nitwits.
Pyotr Rosmenko, a Russian man, stands stiffly and nervously in an ill-fitting suit while commenting on differences between America and "the old country", such as "Here in America, is very good, everyone watch television. In old country, television watches you!" This type of joke has come to be known as the Russian reversal.
Rabbi Shankar (a pun on Ravi Shankar) was an Indian guru who dresses in a Nehru jacket dispensing pseudomystical Eastern wisdom laden with bad puns. He held up two fingers in a peace sign whenever he spoke.
An unnamed character in a yellow raincoat and hat, riding a tricycle and then falling over, was frequently used to link between sketches.  The character was portrayed by many people besides Johnson, including his brother Coslough (a writer for the show), Alan Sues, and Johnny Brown.
The Scandinavian Storyteller – spoke gibberish, including non-sensical 'Knock Knock' jokes in the Joke Wall. No one could ever understand him. Possibly inspiration for the Muppets' Swedish Chef character.
Ruth Buzzi:
Gladys Ormphby – A drab, relatively young spinster, she is the eternal target of Arte Johnson's Tyrone; when Johnson left the series, Gladys retreated into recurring daydreams, often involving marriages to historical figures, including Christopher Columbus and Benjamin Franklin (both played by Alan Sues). She typically hit people repeatedly with her purse. The character was recreated, along with Tyrone, in Baggy Pants and the Nitwits. Buzzi also performed as Gladys on Sesame Street and The Dean Martin Show, most notably in the Celebrity Roasts.
Doris Swizzle – A seedy barfly, she is paired with her husband, Leonard Swizzle, played by Dick Martin.
Kim Hither – An exceedingly friendly hooker, commonly seen in sketches or at the cocktail party propositioning people while leaning against a lamppost.
Busy Buzzi – A cold and heartless old-style Hedda Hopper-type Hollywood gossip columnist.
Kathleen Pullman – A wicked parody of televangelist Kathryn Kuhlman. This always helpful but overdramatic woman is always eager to help people. 
Laverne Blossom - A former silent movie star with dark make-up round the eyes. She often attends the cocktail party in the later seasons. 
Henry Gibson:
The Poet held an oversized flower and nervously read offbeat poems. (His stage name was a play on the name of playwright Henrik Ibsen).
The Parson – A character who makes ecclesiastical quips. In 1970, he officiated at a near-marriage for Tyrone and Gladys.
Would frequently just pop up & utter the phrase "Marshall McLuhan, what are you doin'?".
Also played a cub reporter for Busy Buzzi.   While she was looking for a scoop, Gibson would come in with one (usually about Steve McQueen) which Buzzi would completely garble up to sound like something out of left field.
Goldie Hawn is best known as the giggling "dumb blonde", stumbling over her lines, especially when she introduced Dan's "News of the Future". In the earliest episodes, she recited her dialogue sensibly and in her own voice, but as the series progressed, she adopted a Dumb Dora character with a higher-pitched giggle and a vacant expression, which endeared her to viewers. Frequently did a Donald Duck voice at inappropriate times, such as when she was expected to sing or doing ballet.

Lily Tomlin:
Ernestine/Miss Tomlin – An obnoxious telephone operator, she has no concern at all for her customers & constantly mispronounced their names. Her close friend is fellow telephone operator, Phenicia; and her boyfriend, Vito. She would boast of being a high school graduate. Tomlin later performed Ernestine on Saturday Night Live and Happy New Year, America. She also played the Ernestine character for a comedy album called This Is A Recording. At the suggestion of CFG, Ernestine began dialing with her middle finger in Season 4, sometimes blatantly flipping "the bird" to the camera as a result. Censors never caught on – "we know she's doing something wrong, we just can't put our finger on it!"
Edith Ann – A -year-old child, she ends each of her short monologues with: "And that's the truth", followed by blowing a raspberry. Tomlin performs her skits in an oversized rocking chair that makes her appear small. Tomlin later performed Edith Ann on children's shows such as Sesame Street and The Electric Company.
Mrs. Earbore (the "Tasteful Lady") – A prim society matron, Mrs. Earbore expressed quiet disapproval about a tasteless joke or remark, and then rose from her chair with her legs spread, getting doused with a bucket of water or the sound of her skirt ripping.
Dotty – A crass and rude grocery checker who tended to annoy her customers at the store where she worked.
Lula – A loud and boisterous woman with a Marie Antoinette hair-do who always loved a party.
Suzie Sorority of the Silent Majority – clueless hippie college student who ended each bit with "Rah!"
The Babbler – A character given to speaking exuberantly and at great length while digressing after every few words and never staying on one subject, producing an unbroken, incomprehensible monologue.
Judy Carne had two characters known for their robotic speech and movement:
Mrs. Robot in "Robot Theater" – A female companion to Arte Johnson's "Mr. Robot".
The Talking Judy Doll – She is usually played with by Arte Johnson, who never heeded her warning: "Touch my little body, and I hit you!"
The Sock-It-To-Me Girl in which she would usually end up being splashed with water and/or falling through a trap door and/or getting conked on the head by a large club or mallet and/or knocked out by a boxing glove on a spring.
Jo Anne Worley sometimes sings off-the-wall songs using her loud operatic voice or displaying an advanced state of pregnancy, but is better remembered for her mock outrage at "chicken jokes" and her melodic outcry of "Bo-ring!". At the cocktail parties, she would talk about her never-seen married boyfriend/lover "Boris" (who, according to her in a Season 3 episode, was finally found out by his wife).
Alan Sues:
Big Al – A clueless and fey sports anchor, he loves ringing his "Featurette" bell, which he calls his "tinkle".
 He would dress in drag as his former co-star, Jo Anne Worley, including skits where he appeared as a "fairy godmother". imitating Worley's boisterous laugh and offering help or advice to a Cinderella-type character in a conversation full of double entendres.
Uncle Al, the Kiddies' Pal – A short-tempered host of a children's show, he usually goes on the air with a hangover: "Oh, kiddies, Uncle Al had a lot of medicine last night." Whenever he got really agitated, he would yell to "Get Miss Twinkle on the phone!"
Grabowski – a benchwarmer football player obviously not cut out for the sport. Ex: "He pushed me! He pushed me!... they all pushed me!" and "No, you can't wear your ballet slippers on the field, Grabowski!"
Boomer – A self-absorbed "jock" bragging about his athletic exploits.
Ambiguously gay saloon patron – while Dan and Dick ordered whiskey, he would saunter up to the bar and ask for a fruit punch or frozen daiquiri.
In the last season where he was a regular, he would be the one who got water thrown on him after a ticking alarm clock went off (replacing Judy Carne as the one who always got drenched). 
Pamela Rodgers – "Your man in Washington"; she would give 'reports' from the Capitol that were usually double entendres to give the impression that the Congressmen were fooling around with her.
Jeremy Lloyd – scrunched himself into an ultra-short character a la Toulouse-Lautrec.
Dennis Allen:
Lt. Peaches of the Fuzz – a stumble-bum police officer.
Chaplain Bud Homily – a droll clergyman who often falls victim to his own sermons.
Eric Clarified (a play on news commentator Eric Sevareid) – a correspondent for Laugh-In Looks at the News who further muddles up obfuscatory government statements he has been asked to clarify. Rowan would often throw to another correspondent (played by Sues) to analyze Eric Clarified's statements in turn. 
Barbara Sharma:
The Burbank Metre Made – a dancing meter maid who tickets anything from trees to baby carriages. 
An aspiring actress who often plays foil in cocktail-party segments to another "high-society" character (Tomlin).
In season four, a Ruby Keeler-esque dancer (and arch-nemesis of Johnson's Wolfgang) who often praises Vice President Spiro Agnew.
Johnny Brown lent his impersonations of Ed Sullivan, Alfred Hitchcock, Ralph Kramden and the Kingfish from Amos 'n' Andy.
Ann Elder as Pauline Rhetoric (a play on NBC reporter Pauline Frederick), the chief interviewer for the Laugh-In News segments.
Moosie Drier & Todd Bass – Drier did the "kids news for kids" segment of the Laugh-In news. Bass teamed with Drier in Season 6 to read letters from a treehouse
Larry Hovis – the Senator, the Texan, David Brinkley, Father Time
Richard Dawson – W.C. Fields, Groucho Marx, Hawkins the Butler, who always started his piece by asking "Permission to ...?" and proceeded to fall over.
Roddy Maude-Roxby, Pigmeat Markham – Here Come Da Judge (Roxby for Season 1, Markham for Season 2)
Dave Madden – would always throw confetti after "a naughty thought", usually a punch line that was a double-entendre. Once while kissing Carne, confetti erupted around him

Memorable moments

The first season featured some of the first music videos seen on network TV, with cast members appearing in films set to the music of the Nitty Gritty Dirt Band, the Bee Gees, the Temptations, the Strawberry Alarm Clock, and the First Edition.

During the September 16, 1968, episode, Richard Nixon, running for president, appeared for a few seconds with a disbelieving vocal inflection, asking "Sock it to me?" Nixon was not doused or assaulted. An invitation was extended to Nixon's opponent, Vice President Hubert Humphrey, but he declined. According to George Schlatter, the show's creator, "Humphrey later said that not doing it may have cost him the election", and "[Nixon] said the rest of his life that appearing on Laugh-In is what got him elected. And I believe that. And I've had to live with that." In an episode of the ill-fated 1977 revival, Rich Little as Nixon says, "I invited the American people to sock-it-to-me.... you can stop now".

After winning the Academy Award for Best Supporting Actress in Cactus Flower, Goldie Hawn made a guest appearance in the third episode of the fourth season.  She began the episode as an arrogant snob of an actress; however, a bucket of water thrown at her transformed her back to her giggling dumb blonde persona.

On multiple occasions, producer George Schlatter attempted to get William F. Buckley Jr. to appear on the show, only to be refused each time until he suddenly agreed to an appearance. In the episode that aired December 28, 1970, Buckley appeared in an unusual sit-down segment (portions of which were scattered throughout the episode) flanked by Rowan and Martin and fielding questions from the cast (which included Lily Tomlin doing her Babbler and Ernestine shticks) and giving humorous answers to each. Near the end, when Rowan asked Buckley why he finally agreed to appear on the show, Buckley explained that Schlatter had written him "an irresistable letter" in which he promised to fly Buckley out to Burbank "in an airplane with two right wings". At the end, Rowan thanked him for appearing: "You can't be that smart without having a sense of humor, and you have a delightful one."

The 100th episode featured John Wayne, Tiny Tim & the return of several former cast members. Wayne, with his ear cupped, read the line "and me, I'm Gary Owens" instead of Owens himself. Wayne also shook Tiny Tim's hand, pretending that his grip was too overpowering.

Catchphrases
In addition to those already mentioned, the show created numerous catchphrases:
"Look that up in your Funk and Wagnalls! (a lesser-known set of reference books whose phonetically funny name helped both Laugh-In and The Tonight Show Starring Johnny Carson to poke fun at NBC censors)
"You bet your sweet bippy!" (Dick Martin)
"Ring my chimes!" (Flip Wilson)
"Beautiful downtown Burbank" (various actors/characters, referring tongue-in-cheek to the Los Angeles suburb in which the NBC studios (and thus the program) were located; the same term was frequently used by Johnny Carson on The Tonight Show Starring Johnny Carson).
"One ringy-dingy ... two ringy-dingys ..." (Ernestine's mimicking of the rings while she was waiting for someone to pick up the receiver on the other end of the telephone lines)
"A gracious good afternoon. This is Miss Tomlin of the telephone company. Have I reached the party to whom I am speaking?" Ernestine's greeting to people whom she would call. She would then mispronounce the names of famous people: Gore Vidal was "Mr. Veedle", William F. Buckley was "Mr. F'buckley". Richard Nixon was simply "Milhouse".
"I just wanna swing!" Gladys Ormphby's catchphrase
"Was that another chicken joke?" – Jo Anne Worley's outraged cry, a takeoff on Polish jokes
"Sock it to me!" experienced its greatest exposure on Laugh-In although the phrase had been featured in songs such as Aretha Franklin's 1967 "Respect" and Mitch Ryder & The Detroit Wheels' 1966 "Sock It To Me, Baby!"
"Blow in my ear and I'll follow you anywhere."
"Now, that's a no-no!"
"Morgul the Friendly Drelb" – a pink Abominable Snowman-like character that was introduced in the second episode and bombed so badly, his name was used in various announcements by Gary Owens for the rest of the series (usually at the end of the opening cast list – "Yours truly, Gary Owens, and Morgul as the Friendly Drelb!") and credited as the author of a paperback collection of the show's sketches. On the spin-off "Letters To Laugh-In", "Morgul" would reach out of the podium & hand Owens the card containing the next category in a manner similar to Thing on The Addams Family.
"Want a Walnetto?" was a pick-up line Tyrone would try on Gladys, which always resulted in a purse drubbing.
"Here come da Judge"
"Verrry in-te-res-ting" (Wolfgang the soldier)
"And that's the truth – PFFFFT!" (Edith Ann)
"Go to your room!" – "Big kid" Dan's response to a particularly bad joke, as if to put that cast member in time out like a child.
"He pushed me!" – usually said by Sues when another cast member would bump him.
"Marshall McLuhan, what are you doin – uttered by Gibson randomly between sketches.
"How does that grab you?" JoAnne Worley
"Oh... that Henny Youngman" – preceded by cast members quoting a series of his punchlines in succession, but without the jokes leading up to them.
"He was a much better person for that" – as "Sock it to me!" was phased out following Carne's departure, this became the line used for similar sketches
"Well, I'll drink to that", "I did not know that!", "Whatever turns you on" and "That's funny, so did she" – Dick Martin
"Goodnight, Lucy" – During the first three seasons, Laugh-In was scheduled opposite Lucille Ball's third television series, Here's Lucy.  At the end of the show, one or more cast members would say, "Goodnight, Lucy."  Dick Martin had been a regular cast member in the first season of Ball's second series, The Lucy Show.
"Goodnight, Dick" – the closing portion of each episode of Seasons 1 and 2 and began with the guest star & numerous cameos all saying "Goodnight, Dick". Occasionally, one of the cameo actors would say "Who's Dick?".  This shtick was revived in the sixth season, usually after the end credits.
"Gotcha!"
"Wr-r-r-ong!" – spoken in a cameo by Otto Preminger, subsequent cameo actors would repeat the line, mimicking Preminger's delivery of it.
"How would I know? I've never been out with one"
"I think I've got it too" – running gag where the person would say this & start scratching themselves for no particular reason.
"Blah! Blah!" – staff writer Chet Dowling would appear at random in various episodes throughout the fourth season, wearing a tux and this was all he'd ever say.
"That's not funny"
"Wacker!" – this name became used often in sketches after the Bobby Darin episode of Season 2. Darin had done a sketch with Martin & hilariously proceeded to call him 'Wacker' throughout the rest of the show
"I've Got A Secret" – paying homage to the long-running game show, a running gag during the first two seasons was to have celebrity cameos claiming to be a celebrity of the opposite gender "...and I've REALLY got a secret!". Examples were Joey Bishop stating "My name is Joey Heatherton...", James Garner as Loretta Young, Jill St. John as Jack Jones and each of the female cast members as Tiny Tim.

Merchandise tie-ins and spin-offs

A chain of Laugh-In restaurants opened in several states during 1968–69; primarily in Michigan, Ohio and Florida.  Psychedelically themed like the show, they offered such menu items as Bippy Burgers, Is That A Chicken Joke Chicken, Fickle Finger Of Fate Fries, Beautiful Downtown Burbank Burgers, Fickle Finger Franks, Verrrry Interesting Sandwiches, I'll Drink To That beverages, Sock It To Me soups, Laugh-In Fortune Cookies and Here Come Da Fudge sundaes. Staff often rode around on red tricycles wearing yellow raincoats and hats. All locations were closed by the mid-1970's. Menus, french fry bags, sandwich wraps, napkins, salt and pepper shakers and other memorabilia are still sold on EBay.

A humor magazine tie-in, Laugh-In Magazine, was published for one year (12 issues: October 1968 through October 1969—no issue was published December 1968), and a 1968-1972 syndicated newspaper comic strip was drawn by Roy Doty and eventually collected for a paperback reprint.

The Laugh-In trading cards from Topps had a variety of items, such as a card with a caricature of Jo Anne Worley with a large open mouth. With a die-cut hole, the card became interactive; a finger could be inserted through the hole to simulate Worley's tongue. Little doors opened on Joke Wall cards to display punchlines.

On Letters to Laugh-In, a short-lived spin-off daytime show hosted by Gary Owens, cast members read jokes sent in by viewers, which were scored by applause meter. The eventual winning joke was read by actress Jill St. John: "What do you get when you cross an elephant with a jar of peanut butter? A 500 pound sandwich that sticks to the roof of your mouth!"

A cross-promotional episode of I Dream of Jeannie ("The Biggest Star in Hollywood", February 1969) features Judy Carne, Arte Johnson, Gary Owens, and producer George Schlatter playing themselves in a story about Jeannie being sought after to appear on Laugh-In.

In 1969, a Laugh-In View-Master packet was issued by General Aniline and Film (GAF); The packet featured 21 3D images from the show.

The horror spoof film The Maltese Bippy (1969) starring Dan Rowan and Dick Martin was loosely related to the series. Pamela Rodgers was the only Laugh-In cast member to co-star in the film.

In 1969, Sears, Roebuck and Company produced a 15-minute short, Freeze-In, which starred series regulars Judy Carne and Arte Johnson. Made to capitalize on the popularity of the series, the short was made for Sears salesmen to introduce the new Kenmore freezer campaign. A dancing, bikini-clad Carne provided the opening titles with tattoos on her body.

Two LPs of material from the show were released: the first on Epic Records (FXS-15118, 1968); the second, which did not feature Rowan or Martin, was entitled Laugh-In '69 and released on Reprise Records (RS 6335, 1969).

DVD releases
Between 2003 and 2004, Rhino Entertainment Company (under its Rhino Retrovision classic TV entertainment brand), under license from the rightsholder at the time, SFM Entertainment, released two The Best Of releases of the show, each containing six episodes presented in its original, uncut broadcast version. In 2003, Rhino, through direct-response marketing firm Guthy-Renker, also released a series of DVDs subtitled The Sock-It-To-Me Collection, with each DVD containing two episodes.

On June 19, 2017, Time Life, another direct-response marketer, released Rowan & Martin's Laugh-In: The Complete Series on DVD in Region 1, in a deal with current rightsholder Proven Entertainment. The 38-disc set contains all 140 episodes of the series, complete and uncut, restored and remastered as well as many bonus features and a special 32-page collector's book.

On September 5, 2017, Time Life began releasing individual complete season sets on DVD, beginning with the first season. This was followed by the second season on January 9, 2018, and the third season on March 6, 2018. The fourth season was released on May 8, 2018. Season 5 was released on July 10, 2018. Finally, Season 6 was released on September 4, 2018.

Ratings
TV season, ranking, average viewers per episode
1967–1968: #21 (21.3)
1968–1969: #1 (31.8)
1969–1970: #1 (26.3)
1970–1971: #13 (22.4)
1971–1972: #22 (21.4)
1972–1973: #51 (16.7)

Revival
In 1977, Schlatter and NBC briefly revived the property as a series of specials – titled simply Laugh-In – with a new cast. The standout was a then-unknown Robin Williams, whose starring role on ABC's Mork & Mindy one year later prompted NBC to rerun the specials as a summer series in 1979. Also featured were Wayland Flowers and Madame (as well as his other puppet, "Jiffy"), former child evangelist Marjoe Gortner, former Barney Miller actress June Gable, Good Times actor Ben Powers, Bill Rafferty of Real People and comedian Ed Bluestone. Rowan and Martin, who owned part of the Laugh-In franchise, were not involved in this project. They sued Schlatter for using the format without their permission, and won a judgment of $4.6 million in 1980.

In 1987, George Schlatter attempted a revival of the program called George Schlatter's Comedy Club, the weekly half-hour program that appeared in syndication through King World Productions during the 1987-1988 television season. Featuring stand-up comedy routines alongside quick comedy sketches similar to Laugh-In, the series was hosted by Schlatter himself.

In 2019, Netflix produced a special tribute to the original series entitled, Still Laugh-In: The Stars Celebrate. Tomlin, Buzzi and Worley appeared in the special.

Retrospective criticism 

Critics views in retrospect, while noting it being groundbreaking, have also indicated that it hasn't aged well. Various aspects of the show at the time come across as racist in current times. Other aspects stereotyped gay people and women. While the humour was appreciated by some at the time of release, with taste more sophisticated now, aren't seen as humourous. 

While the show included black actors, and made some comments on racism about black people, at the same time, it was noted the show featured white actors portraying Asians in yellowface.

Awards and honors
Emmy Awards
Won:
1968: Outstanding Musical or Variety Program, George Schlatter (for the September 9, 1967 special)
1968: Outstanding Musical or Variety Series, George Schlatter
1968: Outstanding Writing Achievement in Music or Variety, Chris Bearde, Phil Hahn, Jack Hanrahan, Coslough Johnson, Paul Keyes, Marc London, Allan Manings, David Panich, Hugh Wedlock, Jr., Digby Wolfe
1968: Outstanding Individual Achievement in Electronic Production – Arthur Schneider (tape editor)
1969: Outstanding Musical or Variety Series – Paul Keyes (producer), Carolyn Raskin (producer), Dick Martin (star), Dan Rowan (star)
1969: Special Classification Achievements – Individuals (Variety Performances), Arte Johnson
1971: Outstanding Directorial Achievement in Variety or Music, Mark Warren (episode #4.7 with Orson Welles)
Nominated:
1968: Outstanding Directorial Achievement in Variety or Music, Bill Foster (pilot episode)
1968 Outstanding Directorial Achievement in Variety or Music, Gordon Wiles
1968: Outstanding Writing Achievement in Music or Variety, – Larry Hovis, Paul Keyes, Jim Mulligan, David Panich, George Schlatter, Digby Wolfe (pilot episode)
1969: Special Classification Achievements – Individuals (Variety Performances), Ruth Buzzi
1969: Special Classification Achievements – Individuals (Variety Performances), Goldie Hawn
1969: Outstanding Directorial Achievement in Comedy, Variety or Music – Gordon Wiles (For episode on 3 February 1969)
1969: Outstanding Writing Achievement in Comedy, Variety or Music – various writers (For episode on 3 February 1969)
1969: Outstanding Individual Achievement in Music – Billy Barnes (special material)
1969: Special Classification Achievements – Individuals (Variety Performances) – Ruth Buzzi
1969: Special Classification Achievements – Individuals (Variety Performances) – Goldie Hawn
1969: Outstanding Achievement in Art Direction and Scenic Design – Ken Johnson
1969: Outstanding Individual Achievement in Electronic Production – John Teele and Bruce Verran (video tape editors)
1969: Outstanding Individual Achievement in Electronic Production – Arthur Schneider (tape editor)
1970: Outstanding Variety or Musical Series – George Schlatter (executive producer), Carolyn Raskin (producer), Paul Keyes (producer), Dan Rowan (star), Dick Martin (star)
1970: Outstanding Writing Achievement in Comedy, Variety or Music – various writers (For episode on 3 November 1969 with Buddy Hackett)
1970: Outstanding Writing Achievement in Comedy, Variety or Music – various writers (For episode on 20 December 1969 with Nancy Sinatra)
1970: Special Classification of Outstanding Program and Individual Achievement – Individuals, Goldie Hawn
1970: Special Classification of Outstanding Program and Individual Achievement – Individuals, Arte Johnson
1970: Outstanding Achievement in Music, Lyrics and Special Material – Billy Barnes (composer) (For episode with Carol Channing)
1970: Outstanding Achievement in Costume Design – Michael Travis
1971: Outstanding Variety Series, Musical – George Schlatter (executive producer), Carolyn Raskin (producer), Paul Keyes (producer), Dan Rowan (star), Dick Martin (star)
1971: Special Classification of Outstanding Program and Individual Achievement – Individuals – Arte Johnson
1971: Special Classification of Outstanding Program and Individual Achievement – Individuals – Lily Tomlin
1971: Outstanding Achievement in Technical Direction and Electronic Camerawork – Marvin Ault (cameraman), Ray Figelski (cameraman), Louis Fusari (technical director), Jon Olson (cameraman), Tony Yarlett (cameraman)
1972: Outstanding Achievement by a Performer in Music or Variety, Ruth Buzzi
1972: Outstanding Achievement by a Performer in Music or Variety, Lily Tomlin
1972: Outstanding Achievement in Music, Lyrics and Special Material – Billy Barnes (For episode with Liza Minnelli)
1973: Outstanding Achievement by a Supporting Performer in Music or Variety – Lily Tomlin
1978: Outstanding Continuing or Single Performance by a Supporting Actress in Variety or Music, Bea Arthur (for episode on 25 October 1977)
1978: Outstanding Achievement in Video Tape Editing for a Series – Ed. J. Brennan (editor) (For show #6–8 February 1978)

Golden Globe Award
Won:
1973: Best Supporting Actress – Television, Ruth Buzzi
1969: Best TV Show
Nominated:
1972: Best Supporting Actress – Television, Lily Tomlin
1971: Best Supporting Actor – Television, Henry Gibson
1970: Best TV Show – Musical/Comedy
1968: Best TV Show

International and U.S. re-broadcasts
 The first four seasons were broadcast on BBC2 from January 1969 to November 1971. Some episodes from seasons 1, 2 and 3 were retransmitted during late 1983 and early 1984. Early broadcasts had to be shown with a black border, as technology was not available to render the 525-line NTSC video recording as a full-screen 625-line PAL picture. This issue was fixed for later broadcasts.
 The series was broadcast on RTÉ One.
 The series originally aired on the 0-10 Network in the 1960s and 1970s. It later appeared in re-runs on the Seven Network in the early 1980s.
 CTV aired the series at the same time as the NBC run.

1983 saw the first 70 one-hour shows syndicated to broadcast stations (the pilot, first three seasons and the first four episodes of season 4). Alternate recut half-hour shows were syndicated through Lorimar Television to local stations in 1983 and later on Nick at Nite in 1987 through August 1990.

The Vivendi Universal-owned popular arts/pop culture entertainment cable network Trio started airing the show in its original one-hour form in the early 2000s; the same abbreviated 70 episode package was run.

In September 2016, digital sub-network Decades started airing the show twice a day in its original one-hour format, complete with the NBC Peacock opening and 'snake' closing. The entire 6 season run was supplied by Proven Entertainment.

In 2018, the original series became available in full on Amazon Prime Video.

In 2020, the complete series became available on Tubi. The show is currently seen on IMDb TV.

See also 

 John Carpenter (game show contestant)

References

External links

FBI file on Rowan and Martins Laugh-In TV Show

1968 American television series debuts
1973 American television series endings
1960s American sketch comedy television series
1960s American variety television series
1970s American sketch comedy television series
1970s American variety television series
Atco Records artists
English-language television shows
Epic Records artists
NBC original programming
Nielsen ratings winners
Primetime Emmy Award for Outstanding Variety Series winners
Television shows adapted into comics